Parliamentary elections were held in Iran in 1956. The result was a victory for the Party of Nationalists, which won 71 of the 136 seats.

Results

References

1956 elections in Asia
1956 in Iran
National Consultative Assembly elections
Lower house elections in Iran